The 2016 Delhi Open was a professional tennis tournament played on outdoor hard courts. It was the third edition of the tournament for the men and for the women. It was part of the 2016 ATP Challenger Tour and the 2016 ITF Women's Circuit, offering a total of $50,000 in prize money in the men's event and $25,000 in the women's event. It took place in New Delhi, India, on 15–21 February 2016.

ATP singles main draw entrants

Seeds 

 1 Rankings as of 8 February 2016.

Other entrants 
The following players received wildcards into the singles main draw:
  Sriram Balaji
  Prajnesh Gunneswaran
  Adil Kalyanpur
  Vijay Sundar Prashanth

The following players received entry from the qualifying draw:
  Jeevan Nedunchezhiyan 
  Kento Takeuchi 
  Vishnu Vardhan 
  Francesco Vilardo

ITF singles main draw entrants

Seeds 

 1 Rankings as of 8 February 2016.

Other entrants 
The following players received wildcards into the singles main draw:
  Sai Chamarthi
  Mahak Jain
  Karman Thandi
  Prarthana Thombare

The following players received entry from the qualifying draw:
  Ola Abou Zekry
  Sowjanya Bavisetti
  Riya Bhatia
  Corinna Dentoni
  Lee Pei-chi
  Natasha Palha
  Yana Sizikova
  Pranjala Yadlapalli

The following player received entry by a lucky loser spot:
  Mihika Yadav

Champions

Men's singles 

 Stéphane Robert def.  Saketh Myneni, 6–3, 6–0

Women's singles 
 Sabina Sharipova def.  Nina Stojanović, 3–6, 6–2, 6–4

Men's doubles 

 Yuki Bhambri /  Mahesh Bhupathi def.  Saketh Myneni /  Sanam Singh, 6–3, 4–6, [10–5]

Women's doubles 
 Hsu Ching-wen /  Lee Ya-hsuan def.  Natela Dzalamidze /  Veronika Kudermetova, 6–0, 0–6, [10–6]

External links 
Official Website
2016 Delhi Open at ITFtennis.com

Delhi Open
2016 ITF Women's Circuit
Sports competitions in Delhi
2016 in Indian tennis